Robert Irving Higgins (born April 21, 1925) is an American jazz trumpeter who played with Les Brown. He was born in Cabarton, Idaho. As a songwriter he was best known for the instrumental "Lovers Leap", which was also recorded by Louis Armstrong.

References

1925 births
Living people
American jazz trumpeters
American male trumpeters
21st-century trumpeters
21st-century American male musicians
American male jazz musicians